Euphorbia vezorum is a species of plant in the family Euphorbiaceae. It is endemic to Madagascar.  Its natural habitat is sandy shores. It is threatened by habitat loss.

References

Endemic flora of Madagascar
vezorum
Vulnerable plants
Taxonomy articles created by Polbot